Edward Burling may refer to:

 Edward J. Burling (1819–1892), American architect
 Edward B. Burling (1870–1966), American lawyer